Mount Albreda is a mountain located in British Columbia, Canada.

Description 

Mount Albreda, elevation , is the fifth-highest summit in the Monashee Mountains. Situated immediately east of the Albreda River, this prominent peak is visible from Highway 5. Precipitation runoff and glacier meltwater from Mount Albreda drains into tributaries of the Albreda River. Topographic relief is significant as the summit rises 1,850 meters (6,070 feet) above Dominion Creek in three kilometers (1.9 mile). The nearest higher neighbor is Dominion Mountain,  to the south-southeast.

History

Mount Albreda is named in association with Albreda River, which was named in 1863 by Dr. Walter Cheadle and Viscount Milton for Milton's aunt, Lady Albreda Elizabeth Wentworth-Fitzwilliam (1829–1891), youngest daughter of the 5th Earl Fitzwilliam. Cheadle originally named this prominent glacier-clad peak "Mount Milton" after Viscount Milton, but a mapmaking error resulted in the present circumstances.  The mountain's toponym was officially adopted April 7, 1965, by the Geographical Names Board of Canada.

The first documented ascent of the summit was made July 18, 1924, by Allen Carpé and Professor Rollin Thomas Chamberlin (son of Thomas Chrowder Chamberlin) via the north glacier and east ridge. A possibility exists that employees of the Canadian Northern Railway may have preceded in reaching the summit, but details have been lost to time.

Climate

Based on the Köppen climate classification, Mount Albreda is located in a subarctic climate zone with cold, snowy winters, and mild summers. Winter temperatures can drop below −20 °C with wind chill factors below −30 °C. This climate supports glaciers on the northern slopes of the mountain.

See also
 
 Geography of British Columbia

References

External links
 Weather forecast: Mount Albreda
 Mount Albreda (photo): Flickr
 Northeast face (photo): Flickr

Three-thousanders of British Columbia
Monashee Mountains
Kamloops Division Yale Land District